Florence Owens Thompson (born Florence Leona Christie; September 1, 1903 – September 16, 1983) was an American woman who was the subject of Dorothea Lange's photograph Migrant Mother (1936), considered an iconic image of the Great Depression. The Library of Congress titled the image: "Destitute pea pickers in California. Mother of seven children. Age thirty-two. Nipomo, California."

Biography
Florence Owens Thompson was born Florence Leona Christie on September 1, 1903, in Indian Territory, present-day Oklahoma. Both of her parents claimed Cherokee descent. Her father, Jackson Christie, allegedly abandoned her mother, Mary Jane Cobb, before she was born, and her mother married Charles Akman (of Choctaw descent) in the spring of 1905. The family lived on a small farm in Indian Territory outside Tahlequah. Cherokee Nation tribal records indicate that Jackson Christie's blood quantum was either full blood or one-half. Mary Jane Cobb claimed she was Cherokee on her May 27, 1894 marriage record to Christie, but later testified under oath before the Dawes Commission that both of her parents were white. While many sources claim Christie abandoned Cobb, he disputed the allegation. Christie served three years in a federal penitentiary in Detroit, Michigan.

Aged 17, Thompson married Cleo Owens, a farmer's 23-year-old son from Stone County, Missouri, on February 14, 1921. They soon had their first daughter, Violet, followed by a second daughter, Viola, and a son, Leroy (Troy). The family migrated west with other Owens relatives to Oroville, California, where they worked in the saw mills and on the farms of the Sacramento Valley. By 1931, Thompson was pregnant with her sixth child, when her husband Cleo died of tuberculosis.

Thompson then worked in the fields and in restaurants to support her six children. In 1933, Thompson had another child, returned to Oklahoma for a time, and then was joined by her parents as they migrated to Shafter, California, north of Bakersfield. There, Thompson met Jim Hill, with whom she had three more children. During the 1930s, the family worked as migrant farm workers following the crops in California and at times into Arizona. Thompson later recalled periods when she picked  of cotton from first daylight until after it was too dark to work. She said: "I worked in hospitals. I tended bar. I cooked. I worked in the fields. I done a little bit of everything to make a living for my kids."

The family settled in Modesto, California in 1945. Well after World War II, Thompson met and married hospital administrator George Thompson. This marriage brought her far greater financial security than she had previously enjoyed.

Migrant Mother

On March 6, 1936, after picking beets in the Imperial Valley, Thompson and her family were traveling on U.S. Highway 101 towards Watsonville "where they had hoped to find work in the lettuce fields of the Pajaro Valley." On the road, the car's timing chain snapped and they coasted to a stop just inside a pea-pickers' camp on Nipomo Mesa. They were shocked to find so many people camping there—as many as 2,500 to 3,500. A notice had been sent out for pickers, but the crops had been destroyed by freezing rain, leaving them without work or pay. Years later, Thompson told an interviewer that when she cooked food for her children that day, other children appeared from the pea pickers' camp asking, "Can I have a bite?"

While Jim Hill, her partner, and two of Thompson's sons went into town to get parts to repair the car, Thompson and some of the children set up a temporary camp. As she waited, photographer Dorothea Lange, working for the Resettlement Administration, drove up and started taking photos of Thompson and her family. She took seven images in the course of ten minutes.

Lange's field notes for the Resettlement Administration were typically very thorough, but on this particular day she had been rushing to get home after a month on assignment, and the notes she submitted with this batch of negatives do not refer to any of the seven photographs she took of Thompson and her family. It seems that the published newspaper reports about this camp were later distilled into captions for the series, which explains inaccuracies on the file cards in the Library of Congress. For example, one of the file cards reads:
 23 years later, Lange wrote of the encounter with Thompson:

Troy Owens, one of Thompson's sons, recounted:

In many ways, Migrant Mother is not typical of Lange's careful method of interacting with her subject. Exhausted after a long road-trip, she did not speak extensively to the migrant woman, or Thompson herself, and may not have recorded any notes.

According to Thompson, Lange promised the photos would never be published. Lange, however, sent them to the San Francisco News before even sending them to the Resettlement Administration in Washington, D.C. The San Francisco News ran the pictures almost immediately and reported that 2,500 to 3,500 migrant workers were starving in Nipomo, California. Within days, the pea-picker camp received  of food from the federal government. Thompson and her family had moved on by the time the food arrived, and were working near Watsonville, California.

While Thompson's identity was not known for over 40 years after the photos were taken, the photos became famous. The image which later became known as Migrant Mother "achieved near mythical status, symbolizing, if not defining, an entire era in United States history". Roy Stryker called Migrant Mother the "ultimate" photo of the Depression Era: "[Lange] never surpassed it. To me, it was the picture ... . The others were marvelous, but that was special ... . She is immortal." As a whole, the photographs taken for the Resettlement Administration "have been widely heralded as the epitome of documentary photography." Edward Steichen described them as "the most remarkable human documents ever rendered in pictures."

Thompson's identity was discovered in the late 1970s. In 1978, acting on a tip, Modesto Bee reporter Emmett Corrigan located Thompson at her mobile home in Space 24 of the Modesto Mobile Village and recognized her from the photograph. Thompson was quoted as saying: "I wish she [Lange] hadn't taken my picture. I can't get a penny out of it. She didn't ask my name. She said she wouldn't sell the pictures. She said she'd send me a copy. She never did." As Lange was funded by the federal government when she took the picture, the image was public domain, and Lange was not entitled to royalties. However, the picture did help make Lange a celebrity and earned her "respect from her colleagues."

While the image was being prepared for exhibit in 1938, the negative of the photo was retouched to remove Florence's thumb from the lower-right corner of the image.

Circulation
In the late 1960s, Bill Hendrie found the original Migrant Mother photograph along with 31 other unretouched, vintage photos by Dorothea Lange in a dumpster at the San Jose Chamber of Commerce. After the death of Hendrie and his wife, their daughter, Marian Tankersley, rediscovered the photos while emptying her parents' San Jose home. In October 2005, an anonymous buyer paid $296,000 at Sotheby's for the 32 rediscovered Lange photos—nearly six times their pre-bid estimate.

In 1998, the retouched photo of Migrant Mother became a 32-cent U.S. Postal Service stamp in the 1930s portion of the Celebrate the Century series. The stamp printing was unusual, as daughters Katherine McIntosh (on the left in the stamp) and Norma Rydlewski (in Thompson's arms in the stamp) were alive at the time of the printing; usually, the Postal Service does not print stamps of individuals who have not been dead for at least 10 years.

In the same month the U.S. stamp was issued, a print of the photograph with Lange's handwritten notes and signature sold in 1998 for $244,500 at Sotheby's New York. In November 2002, Dorothea Lange's personal print of Migrant Mother sold at Christie's New York for $141,500.

Later life, death, and aftermath

Thompson's children bought her a house in Modesto, California in the 1970s, but she preferred living in a mobile home and moved back into one.

Thompson was hospitalized and her family appealed for financial help in late August 1983. By September, the family had collected $35,000 in donations to pay for her medical care. Florence died of "stroke, cancer and heart problems" at Scotts Valley, California, on September 16, 1983 at age 80. She was buried in Lakewood Memorial Park, in Hughson, California, and her gravestone reads: "FLORENCE LEONA THOMPSON Migrant Mother – A Legend of the Strength of American Motherhood."

In a 2008 interview with CNN, one of Thompson's daughters, Katherine McIntosh, recalled her mother as a "very strong lady", and "the backbone of our family". She said: "We never had a lot, but she always made sure we had something. She didn't eat sometimes, but she made sure us children ate. That's one thing she did do." A son, Troy Owens, said that more than 2,000 letters received along with donations for his mother's medical fund led to a re-appraisal of the photo: "For Mama and us, the photo had always been a bit of [a] curse. After all those letters came in, I think it gave us a sense of pride."

Other six photographs
Lange took seven photos that day, the last being Migrant Mother. The following are the six other photos:

References

External links

Overview of the Migrant Mother series at the LOC, including the original without the retouch
Audio of Florence Owens Thompson telling her story
Video of interview of Florence Owens Thompson
Interview with Katherine McIntosh and Norma Rydlewski (Katherine is the baby in the photo and Norma was four years-old when the image was taken); 36 minutes - produced by Blackside for The Great Depression.  
Migrant Mother as an iconic image – excerpt from a book
Article on the photo shoot and reinterpretation of an image

1903 births
1983 deaths
American people of Cherokee descent
People from Cherokee County, Oklahoma
Burials in California
Great Depression in the United States
People notable for being the subject of a specific photograph
People from Oroville, California
1930s in California
20th-century Native Americans